The Chief of Defence Force Staff (C Def F S) was a post in the South African Defence Force and the South African National Defence Force.

History

The Chief of Defence Force Staff was a lieutenant general post in the South African Defence Force which traces its origins from the sixties. In the middle sixties, the expansion of the Defence Force necessitated some changes to the overall structure and at that time, the posts of GOC Joint Combat Forces (GOC JCF), Chief of Defence Staff, Chief of Defence Force Administration to name a few were established. In 1976 this post ceased to exist and was re-established in 1986 during Gen Johannes Geldenhuys' term as C SADF. Its role was to coordinate all efforts of Chief of Staff Personnel , Chief of Staff Intelligence, Chief of Staff  Operations, Chief of Staff Logistics, Chief of Staff Finances and Chief of Staff Planning for the Chief of the Defence Force.

Past appointments

Chief of Defence Staff
 Maj Gen Toby Moll 
 Lt Gen Kalfie Martin 
 Lt Gen Booysie van der Riet 
 Lt Gen Raymond Armstrong

Chief of Defence Force Staff
 Lt Gen Ian Gleeson 
 Lt Gen Kat Liebenberg 
 V Adm Bert Bekker 
 Lt Gen Pierre Steyn 
 Lt Gen Siphiwe Nyanda

Staff Divisions 

The staff divisions were numbered as follows:
 Personnel 1
 Intelligence 2
 Operations 3
 Logistics 4
 Finances 5
 Planning 6

Note: All these divisions had a three star rank as a chief of staff.

See also
 Chief of Corporate Staff

References

Military of South Africa
Chiefs of defence